Toparoa (foaled 1948) was a New Zealand bred thoroughbred racehorse that was most notable for winning the 1955 Melbourne Cup.

Melbourne Cup

Toparoa started as the 6/1 second favourite in the 1955 Melbourne Cup.  Holding favouritism at 2/1 was future Hall of Fame champion Rising Fast who was attempting to go back-to-back after winning the race in 1954.

Rising Fast carried the top weight of 10 stone (63.5 kilograms), whilst Toparoa with jockey Neville Sellwood carried just 7 stone 8 pound (48 kilograms).

Toparoa was able to hold off the fast finishing Rising Fast to win the race by three quarters of a length and give trainer T J Smith his first winner of the Melbourne Cup.  Sellwood was subsequently suspended for two months for causing interference to Rising Fast during the race, however controversy followed when no protest was lodged and Toparoa remained the winner.

Pedigree

References 

Racehorses bred in New Zealand
Racehorses trained in New Zealand
Racehorses trained in Australia
1948 racehorse births
Melbourne Cup winners